The Taroko Music Festival is an annual music festival in Taroko National Park, Xiulin Township, Hualien County, Taiwan. It is organized by Taroko National Park Headquarters.

History
The music festival started in 2002.

See also
 Music of Taiwan
 List of music festivals in Taiwan

References

External links
 

2002 establishments in Taiwan
Annual events in Taiwan
Music festivals established in 2002
Music festivals in Taiwan